Jean Auguste Courtial (19 September 1903 – 26 December 1966) was a French physician, former polytechnician who worked at Curie Institute from 1950 to 1966. 

Courtial was born in Paris. He established the fact that any animal without growth hormone can't have cancer. 

André Gernez celebrated the memory of Jean Courtial to Société d'Encouragement au Progrès in 2009.

References

External links 
 Bull cancer
 Professor Courtial at Curie Institute
 The early workers in clinical radiotherapy of cancer at the Radium Institute of the Curie Foundation, Paris, France

1903 births
1966 deaths
French oncologists
Physicians from Paris